Spengelomenia is a genus of cavibelonian solenogasters, shell-less, worm-like, marine mollusks.

Species
 Spengelomenia bathybia Heath, 1912
 Spengelomenia intermedia Salvini-Plawen, 1978
 Spengelomenia polypapillata Salvini-Plawen, 1978
 Spengelomenia procera Salvini-Plawen, 1978

References

 Heath, H. 1912. Spengelomenia. A new genus of Solenogastres. Zool. Jahrb., Suppl., 15(1): 4654-479
 Salvini-Plawen L v. (1978). Antarktische und subantarktische Solenogastres (eine Monographie: 1898-1974). Zoologica (Stuttgart) 128: 1-305.

Solenogastres